HUFC may refer to one of the following association football clubs:

In England:
Hartlepool United F.C.
Headington United F.C., renamed Oxford United in 1960
Hereford United F.C.
Hinckley United F.C.
Hyde United F.C.
Hastings United F.C.

In the United States:
Hollywood United F.C.

In Myanmar:
 Hanthawaddy United F.C.

In Scotland:
Halkirk United F.C.
Hurlford United F.C.

In Singapore:
Home United FC
Hougang United FC

In fiction:
Harchester United F.C., a fictional club from Sky One's TV series Dream Team